Baréma Bocoum (1914, Mopti – 1973) was a Malian politician and diplomat. Bocoum was the foreign minister of his country from 1961 - 1964. Stade Baréma Bocoum is named after him. Bocoum also served in the French National Assembly from 1956-1958 .

References

External links 
1st page on the French National Assembly website
page on the French National Assembly website

1914 births
1973 deaths
People from Mopti Region
People of French West Africa
Rassemblement Démocratique Africain politicians
Foreign Ministers of Mali
Deputies of the 3rd National Assembly of the French Fourth Republic
Deputies of the 1st National Assembly of the French Fifth Republic